Netrani (historically known as Bajrangi Island, Pigeon Island and also Heart Shaped Island) is a small island of India located in the Arabian Sea. It is mostly famous for Jai Bajrangbali Temple, an ancient Hindu Temple. The island can be seen from the mainland over 15 km (9.3 miles) away. Views above give this island the appearance of being heart-shaped. Its animal inhabitants include wild goats and pigeons. It has scuba diving facilities and is easily accessible from Bhatkal, Mangalore, Goa, Mumbai or Bangalore. There are dive shops at Murdeshwara and Goa which regularly organize trips to the island. It is known locally as Nitra Gudo. The famous Hindu temple Jai Bajrangbali Temple is located here.

Coral reef
Netrani is a coral island whose reefs teem with many varieties of butterfly fish, trigger fish, parrot fish, eel and shrimp. Divers have also reported seeing orcas and whale sharks around the island. Fish eagles thrive on sea snakes and fish. A species of mongoose was also spotted here, confirming mammalian inhabitants apart from bats. Whale sharks were also spotted by snorkelers.
Eighty nine varieties of coral fish were found in one study.

A  rock used for target practice by the Indian Navy raised concerns for causing harm to the island's ecosystem. In 2012, the Karnataka High Court issued a stay on target practice.

Scuba Diving
Netrani Island has several dive sites with visibility ranging from 15 to 20 meters (49.2 to 65.6 feet). Diving is popular between June and September and is done from a boat anchored close to the island; steep cliffs and sharp rocks discourage climbing to the island proper. There are healthy coral reef with a huge variety of reef fish around the island. After initial resistance from the local fishermen, diving is now actively promoted by the Karnataka Tourism.

Bajrangbali temple 
An ancient Hanuman temple is visited by thousands every year. The god Hanuman is said to have landed here and created a clay figurine of Lord Rama. This Story is said to be exist in Vibhishan Purana in which it is mentioned in 42.9.7 , "Lord Hanuman was flying to save Laxmana Then He Rested Here for a While and made a figurine of Lord Rama and Worshipped here and left the place."

In Popular Culture 
The 2022 Kannada Docudrama film Gandhada Gudi featuring Puneeth Rajkumar and Amoghavarsha consists of a scuba diving portion exploring the underwater sea life and coral reefs of Nethrani Islands.

See also

 Coral reefs in India

References 

Islands of Karnataka
Coral islands
Tourist attractions in Uttara Kannada district
Geography of Uttara Kannada district
Islands of India
Uninhabited islands of India